Berga is a town in Catalonia, Spain.

Berga may also refer to:

Places
Berga (Thrace) or Berge, a colony of ancient Athens in Thrace
Berga, Haninge Municipality, an estate and castle in Södermanland, Sweden
Berga Naval Base, a naval base on the Baltic Sea south of Stockholm
Berga Naval Training Schools
Berga, Högsby Municipality, a locality in Småland, Sweden
Berga, Linköping, a residential area in Östergötland, Sweden
Berga, Saxony-Anhalt, a municipality in Saxony-Anhalt, Germany
Berga, Thuringia, a town in Thuringia, Germany, and site of a World War II slave labor and concentration camp
 Berga concentration camp
Berga: Soldiers of Another War, a documentary film about the camp by director Charles Guggenheim
, a neighbourhood in Vicenza, Italy
Teatro Berga, a Roman theatre within the above neighbourhood

Other
Berġa, the Maltese word for auberge; see Auberges built by the Knights Hospitaller